José Antonio González de Salas (1588, Madrid – 1654) was a Spanish humanist and writer.

1588 births
1654 deaths
People from Madrid
Spanish male writers